During World War II, Germany maintained comprehensive lists of enemy weapons which were given designations in German in a system that matched that of German weapons. When these weapons were captured and put into use with German forces they were referred to by these designations.

Background
Before the war began the German armed forces Heereswaffenamt compiled a list of known foreign equipment and assigned a unique number to each weapon. These weapons were called Fremdgerät or Beutegerät ("foreign device" or "captured device") and their technical details were recorded in a fourteen-volume set that was periodically updated. The Germans also captured large amounts of foreign equipment during WWII that they tested and cataloged using the same system. The Germans sometimes referred to these weapons as Kriegsbeute ("war booty") and the Fremdgerät numbers are sometimes referred to as Beutenummern ("booty numbers").  See also Glossary of German military terms.

Designation format
The format for these designations is made up of the following elements:
Calibre expressed in centimetres 
The type of weapon 
A model number (e.g. M23) or year (e.g. 1934) 
In the absence of a model or year number, a unique number was assigned .
A subvariant is indicated with a number after a "/".
A letter indicating the national origin of the weapon.

As an example, "9 cm  Flak M12 (t)" is a Czechoslovakian 90mm anti-aircraft gun Model 12.

Anti-aircraft guns

**Converted to use 88 mm ammunition.

Anti-tank guns

Coastal artillery

Field guns

Fortress guns

Infantry guns

Medium and heavy artillery

Mortars

Mountain guns

Railroad Artillery

Tank guns

See also
 German designations of foreign firearms in World War II
 List of World War II weapons
 List of prototype World War II infantry weapons
 Allies of World War II
 Axis powers
 Neutral powers during World War II

References

Bibliography
 Hogg, Ian (1997).  German Artillery of World War Two. London. Greenhill. 

 

 Chamberlain, Peter (1975). Infantry, Mountain, and Airborne Guns. Gander, Terry. New York: Arco. 
 Chamberlain, Peter (1975). Mortars and Rockets. Gander, Terry. New York: Arco Pub. Co. 

Designations of foreign artillery
World War II artillery of Germany
World War II anti-aircraft guns
World War II anti-tank guns
Coastal artillery
World War II field artillery
World War II mountain artillery
World War II railway artillery
German designations